General Moody may refer to:

Alfred Judson Force Moody (1918–1967), U.S. Army brigadier general
Richard Clement Moody (1813–1887), British Army major general
Young Marshall Moody (1822–1866), Confederate States Army brigadier general

See also
Attorney General Moody (disambiguation)